Now That's What I Call Country Volume 2 is the second country music compilation album from the (U.S.) Now! series, released on August 25, 2009.

The track lineup includes nine songs that topped the Billboard Hot Country Songs chart during 2008 and 2009, including songs from Kenny Chesney, Taylor Swift, Rascal Flatts, Montgomery Gentry, Alan Jackson, Sugarland, Darius Rucker, Dierks Bentley and Lady Antebellum.

Track listing

Charts

Weekly charts

Year-end charts

References

2009 compilation albums
Country music compilation albums
Country 02